Boris Singh Thangjam (born 3 January 2000) is an Indian professional footballer who plays as a winger for Indian Super League club Jamshedpur. He has represented India at various youth international levels.

Career
Born in Manipur, Thangjam was part of the AIFF Elite Academy batch that was preparing for the 2017 FIFA U-17 World Cup to be hosted in India. After the tournament, Thangjam was selected to play for the Indian Arrows, an All India Football Federation-owned team that would consist of India under-20 players to give them playing time. He made his professional debut for the side in the Arrow's first match of the season against Chennai City. He started and scored the third and final goal in the 90th minute for the Indian Arrows as they won 3–0.

International
Thangjam represented the India under-17 side which participated in the 2017 FIFA U-17 World Cup which was hosted in India.

Career statistics

Honours

Jamshedpur
Indian Super League Premiers: 2021–22

References

2000 births
Living people
People from Imphal
Indian footballers
AIFF Elite Academy players
Indian Arrows players
Association football defenders
Footballers from Manipur
I-League players
India youth international footballers
Indian Super League players
ATK (football club) players
ATK Mohun Bagan FC players
Jamshedpur FC players